The Super Bowl of Poker (also known as Amarillo Slim's Super Bowl of Poker or SBOP) was the second most prestigious poker tournament in the world during the 1980s.  While the World Series of Poker was already drawing larger crowds as more and more amateurs sought it out, the SBOP "was an affair limited almost exclusively to pros and hard-core amateurs."

Prior to 1979, the only high dollar tournament a person could enter was the WSOP.  1972 WSOP Main Event Champion and outspoken ambassador for poker, Amarillo Slim saw this as an opportunity.  "The World Series of Poker was so successful that everybody wanted more than one tournament," he said.  Slim called upon his connections and friendships with poker's elite to start a new tournament in the February 1979.  Slim modelled his SBOP after the WSOP with several events and a $10,000 Texas Hold'em Main Event.

One of the principal differences between the WSOP and the SBOP was the prize structure.  The WSOP's prize structure was flat ensuring more people received smaller pieces of the prize pool.  The SBOP typically used a 60-30-10 payout structure.  In other words, only the first three places received money and generally in the ratio of 60% to first place, 30% to second place, and 10% to third. This payment schedule predominated the SBOP for the first 5 years of the event, but as the event grew the number of payouts increased while keeping the payout schedule top heavy.

1983 Tournament

In 1983, 5 Poker Hall of Famers made it to the cash in various tournaments at the SBOP.  Jack Strauss lost to two time World Series of Poker bracelet winner Hans Lund in the SBOP Main Event.  Berry Johnston would finish third in one event while Bobby Baldwin would make it to two cashes.  Billy Baxter, who would later gain fame for suing the IRS in Baxter v United States, also made it to the cash in one event.  Sarge Ferris, a low-key but much respected professional player who was later inducted into the Poker Hall of Fame, won the No Limit 2-7 Lowball.

The 1983, tournament also witnessed Gabe Kaplan from Welcome Back, Kotter win his second SBOP tournament.  When Welcome Back, Kotter went off the air in 1979, its lead character started a career in poker.  During the early 1980s, Kaplan's success, particularly at the SBOP, led him to be considered among poker's elite.  Kaplan made money in two events and won one.

Key

Event 1: $ 10,000 No Limit Hold'em 

 Number of buy-ins: 42
 Total prize pool: $502,500
 Number of payouts: 7
 Reference:

Event 2: Ace-to-Five Lowball 

 Number of buy-ins: Unknown
 Total prize pool: Unknown
 Number of payouts: 1
 Reference:

Event 3: $ 500 Limit Hold'em 

 Number of buy-ins: 144
 Total prize pool: $72,000
 Number of payouts: 3
 Reference:

Event 4: $ 1,000 Ace-to-Five Lowball 

 Number of buy-ins: 35
 Total prize pool: $35,000
 Number of payouts: 3
 Reference:

Event 5: $ 500 Limit Seven Card Stud 

 Number of buy-ins: 78
 Total prize pool: $39,000
 Number of payouts: 3
 Reference:

Event 6: $ 1,000 Limit Hold'em 

 Number of buy-ins: 78
 Total prize pool: $39,000
 Number of payouts: 3
 Reference:

Event 7: $ 5,000 Limit Seven Card Stud

 Number of buy-ins: Unknown
 Total prize pool: $116,000
 Number of payouts: 3
 Reference:

Event 8: $ 5,000 Limit A-5 Lowball

 Number of buy-ins: 18
 Total prize pool: $90,000
 Number of payouts: 3
 Reference:

Event 9: $ 1,000 Limit A-5 Lowball

 Number of buy-ins: Unknown
 Total prize pool: $21,200
 Number of payouts: 3
 Reference:

Event 10: No Limit 2-7 Lowball

 Number of buy-ins: Unknown
 Total prize pool: $120,000
 Number of payouts: 3
 Reference:

Event 11: $ 500 Limit Omaha

 Number of buy-ins: 42
 Total prize pool: $21,000
 Number of payouts: 3
 Reference:

Event 12: $ 500 Limit Hold'em

 Number of buy-ins: Unknown
 Total prize pool: $77,750
 Number of payouts: 3
 Reference:

Event 13: $ 2,500 Limit Seven Card Stud Hi/Lo

 Number of buy-ins: Unknown
 Total prize pool: $60,000
 Number of payouts: 3
 Reference:

Event 14: $ 1,000 No Limit Hold'em

 Number of buy-ins: 128
 Total prize pool: $128,000
 Number of payouts: 3
 Reference:

References

Super Bowl of Poker
1983 in poker